Angélique Marguerite Le Boursier du Coudray (c. 1712 – 17 April 1794) was an influential, pioneering midwife during her lifetime, who gained fame when men were taking over the field. She rose from middle-class origins to become noticed and commissioned by King Louis XV himself.

Life 
Angélique Marguerite Le Boursier du Coudray was born into an eminent French medical family in Clermont-Ferrand. In February 1740, at the age of twenty-five, Angélique du Coudray completed her three-year apprenticeship with Anne Bairsin, Dame Philibet Magin, and passed her qualifying examinations at the College of Surgery École de Chirurgie. Within the next few years, the school of surgery had barred female midwives from receiving instruction. After Du Coudray demanded that the Faculty of Medicine of the University of Paris provide instructions to all midwives and midwifery students by signing a petition, she was accepted into the school.

In 1743, the status of surgeons, who were all male, was raised and they sought to extend their role into the field of midwifery through denying instruction to female midwives. Du Coudray and other female midwives signed a second petition and accused surgeons of neglecting their duties. She argued that by refusing to instruct female midwives, surgeons were allowing midwives to be improperly trained and so causing a shortage of officially accredited midwives. To prevent harm to patients, and to maintain their professional standing distinct from surgeons, the medical doctors continued to allow women to attend. After the situation was solved and all midwives received proper training, Du Coudray became the head accoucheuse at the Hôtel Dieu in Paris. By guiding and leading in this political matter, she became a prominent figure in Paris.

In 1759, she published an early midwifery textbook, Abrégé de l'art des accouchements (Abridgment of the Art of Delivery), which was a revision and expansion of an earlier midwifery textbook published in 1667. The book was translated in many languages including German, Dutch, and English. The textbook provided Coudray’s illustrations to show important maneuvers as well as how dangerous the maneuvers were.

In the same year, the king (Louis XV) commissioned her to teach midwifery to peasant women in an attempt to reduce infant mortality. This had become a political concern because a perceived high rural perinatal mortality, following from the deaths in the Seven Years' War, was depleting France of future citizens.

Between 1760 and 1783, she traveled all over rural France, sharing her extensive knowledge with poor women. During this period, she is estimated to have taught in over forty French cities and rural towns and to have trained 4,000 students directly. She was also responsible for the training of 6,000 other women, who were taught directly by her former students. In addition, she taught about 500 surgeons and physicians, all of them men. In her thirty years of teaching she taught over 30,000 students. Through this educational effort Du Coudray became a national sensation and international symbol of French medical advancement.

Angélique du Coudray died in Bordeaux on April 17, 1794. There is mystery around her death, as it occurred during the Reign of Terror that succeeded the French Revolution. Many scholars believe she was killed during the night because she had previously been commissioned and endorsed by King Louis XV. Others argue that she simply died of old age.

The Machine 

Du Coudray invented the first lifesize obstetrical mannequin, for practicing mock births. It was usually called "The Machine." Each cost about 300 livres to construct, usually out of fabric, leather, and stuffing, and occasionally including actual human bones to form the torso. Various strings and straps serve to simulate the stretching of the birth canal and perineum to demonstrate the process of childbirth. This detail was important, as it allowed the midwife to put two fingers into the mouth, to facilitate the passage of the head in a case of breech presentation. These mannequins were very detailed and accurate. The invention is often attributed to a Scotsman, William Smellie,  but the Royal Brevet of 19 October 1759 already mentioned du Coudray's model, giving her a prior claim on the invention. An historical example of 'The Machine' is kept in the Musée Flaubert et d'histoire de la médecine in Rouen, France, and a copy in the Musée de l'Homme in Paris.

Travels 
Du Coudray first traveled to Moulins in November 1761 from Claremont France. Le Nain, who had heard and learned a lot about du Coudray's childbirth courses in an exchange with letters with Ballainvilliers, was extremely excited about her arrival. He was one of the first people to secure her services in his city. In her first lesson in Moulins, eighty students appeared and the second lesson brought seventy. Fewer students came because this was also harvest time and many women could not be spared from their farm duties. Du Coudray noted how many women had no aptitude and even sent them home, and only a few women really stood out to her. Her course cost the women 36–40 livres, which included the final certificate of completion. She worked her students hard and taught them just the basics, but even this was enough for them to be extremely useful in their cities. Classes took place six days a week, all morning and all afternoon, and lasted around two months, so that every student had plenty of time to listen to lectures and practice each maneuver several times on the machine. Occasionally she would allow her best students to attend live births with her supervision. In most cities she was paid 300 livres a month of her teaching.

Throughout the next year and a half she traveled to Burgundy: to Autun in 1761, Bourg-en-Bresse and Chalone-sur-Saȏne in 1763, and in the same year to Limognes-en-Quercy and Tulle. She then traveled to Angoulȇme in 1764 and Bourdeilles in the same year, then to Poitiers in 1764–65, to Sablés-sur-Sarthe in 1765, and finally to Périgueux and Agen in 1769. She held a similar course of instruction in all these regions of France. In a new development, Du Coudray taught midwives to stop the practice, when an infant was delivered near death, of putting it to one side and focusing on recovery of the mother. She instructed them to attempt to revive the infant, which could be successful.

The Abrégé 
The Abrégé de l'art des accouchements contains du Coudray's lectures in the order that she taught them, starting with the female reproductive organs and the process of reproduction. It then explains the issue of proper prenatal care. Finally, it discusses how to deliver infants, including how to handle common obstetric problems. The Abrégé also covers rare cases that occurred during the birth process, which Du Coudray notes as her "observations". Throughout the book, she refers to her "machine" as a way to explain concepts. Despite its important contributions to the field of midwifery, the Abrégé was neglected when it was initially published, because it was a small, light, unobtrusive volume. Still, the existence of the book served as an influential model for midwives during the eighteenth century.

See also 
 Louyse Bourgeois, ancestor, midwife to Marie de' Medici.

Notes

References

Sources

External links 
 

 Artefacts related to  du Coudray  at the Museum of France On line Archive. Retrieved March 2012
 ,   Jean-Yves Gourdol, Medarus
 Musée du CHU de Rouen Centre Hospitalier Universitaire (CNU Hospital), Rouen, France
 Angélique du Coudray at the Dinner Party database, Brooklyn Museum. Retrieved October 24, 2007

1712 births
1789 deaths
French midwives
French science writers
French women writers
Women science writers
18th-century French women scientists
18th-century French scientists
18th-century French women writers